Abrahams is a surname. Notable people with the surname include:

Abraham Abrahams (1813–1892), South Australian businessman and art connoisseur
Annie Abrahams (born 1954),  Dutch artist
Arthur Abrahams (born 1955), Australian race car driver
Brian Abrahams (born 1947), jazz drummer and vocalist
Carl Abrahams (1911–2005), Jamaican painter
Chris Abrahams (born 1961), New Zealand jazz pianist
Christine Abrahams (1939–1994), Australian art dealer and gallery director
David Abrahams (disambiguation)
Debbie Abrahams (born 1960), British politician
Dorothea Abrahams (1779–1853), West Indian philanthropist
Elihu Abrahams (1927–2018), American physicist
Emanuel M. Abrahams (1866–1913), American businessman and politician
Esther Abrahams (1771–1846), English criminal
Gerald Abrahams (1907–1980), British chess player and barrister
Guy Abrahams (born 1953), Panamanian athlete
Harold Abrahams (1899–1978), British athlete
Israel Abrahams (1858–1925), British scholar of Judaism
Jim Abrahams (born 1944), American movie director and writer
Jon Abrahams (born 1977), American actor
John Abrahams (born 1952), English First class and List A cricketer  
Lionel Abrahams (1928–2004), South African novelist
Louis Barnett Abrahams (1839–1918), head master of the Jews' Free School, London
Marc Abrahams, American magazine publisher
 Mark Abrahams (photographer) (born 1958), American fashion and portrait photographer
 Mark Abrahams (musician), English guitarist
Maurice Abrahams (1883–1931), American songwriter
Mick Abrahams (born 1943), English musician and guitarist
Owen Abrahams (1933–2006), Australian rules footballer
Peter Abrahams (1919–2017), South African novelist
Peter Abrahams (American author) (born 1947), writer of crime thrillers
Rehane Abrahams (born 1970), South African performance artist
Roger D. Abrahams (1933–2017), folklorist, author, and academic
Ruth Abrahams (born 1931), British artist
Shafiek Abrahams (born 1968), South African cricketer
Sidney Abrahams (1885–1957), British athlete and judge of law
Zaraah Abrahams (born 1987), actress

Fictional characters:
Flint Abrahams, the player character featured in the video game Cabela's Dangerous Hunts 2009

Patronymic surnames